Jungle Jitters is a 1938 Warner Bros. Merrie Melodies cartoon directed by Friz Freleng. The short was released on February 19, 1938.

Because of the racial stereotypes of black people throughout the short, it prompted United Artists to withhold it from syndication within the United States in 1968. As such, the short was placed into the Censored Eleven, a group of eleven Merrie Melodies and Looney Tunes shorts withheld from official television distribution in the United States since 1968 due to heavy stereotyping of black people; because its copyright had already lapsed without renewal a year before this decision, it has remained publicly available through numerous unofficial distributors via secondhand prints.

Plot

In a jungle, a primitive tribe of people with black noses and dark skin with light muzzles are going about their day, with the jungle elements being intertwined with modern-day gags; for example, the people dancing around a tent (in a style more reminiscent of Native American fire dances) when it turns into a makeshift merry-go-round, to the tune of "The Merry-Go-Round Broke Down," which promptly deflates and slows to a halt, and at least one of the denizens wears a top hat in resemblance of minstrel show stereotypes.

A traveling dog-faced salesman named Elmer (a parody of Al Pearce's character Elmer Blurt) comes by to offer them the latest in "assorted useful, useless, utensils". The natives, after initially trying their hardest to avoid him, decide he would make a delicious dinner, so they invite him in, ransack his goods, and throw him into a cauldron while a mammy chef prepares him as soup. They proceed to familiarize themselves with vacuum cleaners, batteries, light bulbs, etc.

The village queen (depicted as an old, chicken-like white woman, probably as a parody of Edna May Oliver and possibly to avoid any problems with the Hays code over the issue of miscegenation) hears of the arrival of the salesman, and desperate for a husband, she brings him in. As Elmer delivers his sales pitch, the queen sees him as Clark Gable and Robert Taylor and is smitten, demanding her to be married right away. The two are rushed into a marriage, and when asked to kiss the bride, Elmer panics and jumps back into the cauldron; in a closing shot, he curses his captors with the hope that "they all get indigestion" as he submerges into the pot to his death.

Reception
The Film Daily said on January 31, 1938, "Producer Leon Schlesinger goes to darkest Africa in this one with a highly amusing set of characters... There are some very funny sequences and gags, with the characterizations very amusing."

National Exhibitor agreed on February 1: "It sounds forced to say that this is better than the best so far, but that is what one must say about a series that improves continually. This is full of cute little touches that will be best appreciated by a class audience, but will still have the masses chuckling."

Home media

Jungle Jitters fell into the public domain in 1967, and is available on many public domain home video collections.

Notes
A film by the name of "Jungle Jitters" was referenced by Daffy Duck in the 1950 Looney Tunes short The Ducksters but is not related to this short, as the film mentioned in The Ducksters features a gorilla, which this short does not.

See also
List of animated films in the public domain in the United States

References

External links

 Watch Jungle Jitters (uncensored) in fully restored HD at Laugh Bureau Vintage

1938 films
1938 animated films
1938 short films
Articles containing video clips
Films about cannibalism
Censored Eleven
Films about race and ethnicity
Films scored by Carl Stalling
Short films directed by Friz Freleng
Films set in Africa
Merrie Melodies short films
Queens, New York, in fiction
Warner Bros. Cartoons animated short films
Vitaphone short films
1930s Warner Bros. animated short films